
This is a list of aircraft in alphabetical order beginning with 'Tn'.

Tn

TNCA 
(Talleres Nacionales de Construcciones Aeronáuticas - national aviation workshops)
see also Azcárate
 TNCA 1-E
 TNCA 2-E-98 Sonora
 TNCA 3-E-130 Tololoche
 TNCA 4-E-131 Quetzalcoatl
 TNCA 5-E-132 Parasol - Angel Lascurain
 TNCA 6-E-133
 TNCA 6-E-136??
 TNCA 6-E-133
 TNCA 7-E-134
 TNCA 8-E-135
 TNCA Avro Anáhuac
 TNCA Serie A - biplane.
 TNCA Serie B
 TNCA Series C
 TNCA Serie D - derived from Bleriot and Morane-Saulnier aircraft.
 TNCA Serie E - biplane.
 TNCA Serie F - derived from Bleriot and Morane-Saulnier aircraft.
 TNCA Serie G - derived from Bleriot and Morane-Saulnier aircraft.
 TNCA Serie H - bomber, monoplane, high wing, dual control.
 TNCA Azcárate E
 TNCA Azcárate O-E-1
 TNCA Balbuena 20 de noviembre
 TNCA Barreda
 TNCA Corsario Azcárate
 TNCA MTW-1
 TNCA Sea 2 - (Antonio Sea)
 TNCA Sea-4 - (Antonio Sea)
 TNCA Sonora
 TNCA Toloche - (Angel Lascurain)
 TNCA TTS-5
 TNCA ETP-1 Teziutlan (Antonio Zea)
 TNCA Latino America (Juan Guillermo Villasana)
 TNCA Brown Special (Lawrence W. Brown)
 TNCA S-2

References

Further reading

External links 

 List of aircraft (T)